Hailsham Town Football Club is a football club based in Hailsham, East Sussex, England. The club are known locally as 'The Stringers', a nickname which derives from traditional industry in the town, and was adopted officially at the turn of the millennium.

History
The club was established in 1885. They won the Sussex Junior Cup in 1895–96, and were founder members of the East Sussex League in 1896. The club finished bottom of the league for four consecutive seasons between 1901–02 and 1904–05 and then again in 1906–07 and 1907–08, after which they left the league. In 1912 the club merged with Hailsham Athletic.

Shortly before World War I the club was renamed Hailsham Butchers, but reverted to the name Hailsham shortly afterwards. They rejoined the East Sussex League in 1920 and although the club finished bottom of the league in 1925–26, they were runners-up in 1927–28, before finishing bottom again in 1929–30, 1930–31 and 1931–32. The club were league runners-up for a second time in 1937–38. After finishing bottom of the table again in 1948–49 and 1950–51, they won the East Sussex League for the first time in 1953–54, a season which also saw them win the Sussex Intermediate Cup.

In 1955 Hailsham joined Division Two of the Sussex County League under the name Hailsham Football Club. They won the Division Two Invitation Cup in their first season, but resigned from the league during the 1962–63 season. They subsequently joined the Eastbourne & District League, before returning to the East Sussex League in 1968, when they joined Division Two.

Hailsham were Division Two champions in their first season back in the East Sussex League, earning promotion to Division One. They went on to win the Division One title at the first attempt. In 1972, the now-renamed Hailsham Town transferred to the Southern Counties Combination. They won the league in 1974–75 and were promoted to Division Two of the Sussex County League. After finishing as Division Two runners-up in 1980–81 they were promoted to Division One. They won the League Cup in 1994–95, beating Wick 2–1 in the final, and remained in Division One until being relegated at the end of the 1998–99 season. However, a third-place finish in Division Two in 2000–01 saw them promoted back to Division One.

In 2005–06 Hailsham won the Sussex RUR Cup, defeating Whitehawk 2–0 in the final. The club were relegated again in 2010–11, but finished second in Division Two the following season to earn an immediate promotion back to Division One. In 2015 the league was renamed the Southern Combination, with Division One becoming the Premier Division. They finished bottom of the Premier Division in 2016–17 and were relegated to Division One.

Honours
Southern Combination
League Cup winners 1994–95
Division Two Invitation Cup winners 1955–56
Southern Counties Combination
Champions 1974–75
East Sussex League
Champions 1953–54, 1969–70
Division Two champions 1968–69
Sussex RUR Cup
Winners 2005–06
Sussex Intermediate Cup
Winners 1953–54
Sussex Junior Cup
Winners 1895–96

Records
Best FA Cup performance: Third qualifying round, 1989–90, 1990–91
Best FA Vase performance: Fifth round, 1988–89
Record attendance: 1,350 vs Hungerford Town, FA Vase fifth round, 1989
Most appearances: Phil Comber, 713
Most goals: Howard Stevens, 51

See also
Hailsham Town F.C. players

References

External links
Official website

Football clubs in England
Football clubs in East Sussex
Association football clubs established in 1885
1885 establishments in England
Hailsham
East Sussex Football League
Southern Combination Football League